The Protos was a wingless Formula 2 racing car that appeared in 1967. Powered by the then-standard Ford-Cosworth 1600cc FVA-engine, it was noticeable for its slippery aerodynamic Frank Costin design, with an almost-enclosed 'bubble' canopy over the cockpit and a chassis partially made of the very light but fragile plywood. Although fairly quick on fast tracks, it did not become a front runner and did not score wins during the European F2 season. Drivers included Brian Hart and Pedro Rodríguez.

External links
Protos F2

British racecar constructors
Formula Two constructors